is a city located in northern Hyōgo Prefecture, Japan.

Geography 
Asago is located in the north of Hyōgo Prefecture. It is located in the east of Chūgoku Mountains, and the mountains and forests were occupy 93％ of the town. The Maruyama  flows from south to north in the town. The Tataragi Dam was built across the Tataragi stream, a tributary of the Maruyama.

Neighbouring municipalities 
Hyōgo Prefecture
 Kamikawa
 Shisō
 Taka
 Tanba
 Toyooka
 Yabu
Kyoto Prefecture
 Fukuchiyama

Climate
Asago has a humid subtropical climate (Köppen climate classification Cfa) with hot summers and cool to cold winters. Precipitation is significantly higher in summer than in winter, though on the whole lower than most parts of Honshū, and there is no significant snowfall.

Demographics
Per Japanese census data, the population of Asago in 2020 is 28,989 people. Asago has been conducting censuses since 1960.

History 
The area of Asago was in ancient Tajima Province and is the location of many burial mounds from the Kofun period. These include the Chasuriyama Kofun in Wadayama, one of the largest enpun (円墳)-style elliptical burial mounds in the Kansai region. The Ikuno Silver Mine opened in 807 in the early Heian period and mining continue through the Edo Period. During the Sengoku period the area was under the control of the Yamana clan, the shugo of Tajima Province and Takeda Castle was the stronghold their retainers, the Otagaki clan. Following the establishment of the Tokugawa shogunate, the area was mostly tenryō territory under direct control of the shogunate due to the importance of the silver mine, with some small areas undertone control of Toyooka Domain or Izushi Domain. Following the Meiji restoration, the area was under"Toyooka Prefecture" until incorporated into Hyōgo Prefecture in 1876. The town of Ikuno and the villages of Yamaguchi and Akagawa were created with the establishment of the modern municipalities on April 1, 1889.  Asago was founded on March 31, 1954, from the merger of the former villages of Yamaguchi and Nakagawa. By 2004, the town had an estimated population of 7,465 and a density of 57.33 persons per km². The total area was 130.20 km². On April 1, 2005, Asago absorbed the towns of Ikuno, Santō and Wadayama (all from Asago District) to create the city of Asago.

Government
Asago has a mayor-council form of government with a directly elected mayor and a unicameral city council of 18 members. Asago contributes one member to the Hyogo Prefectural Assembly. In terms of national politics, the city is part of Hyōgo 5th district of the lower house of the Diet of Japan.

Economy
Asago has mostly a rural economy based on agriculture and commerce. Local industries include food processing, metal products, electrical machinery, and non-ferrous metals.

Education
Asago has seven public elementary schools and four public middle schools operated by the city government and two public high schools operated by the Hyōgo Prefectural Department of Education. There is also one private middle school and one private high school. The prefecture also operates one special education school for the handicapped.

Transportation

Railway 
 JR West – San'in Main Line
  - 
 JR West – Bantan Line
  -  -  -  -

Highways 
  Kitakinki-Toyooka Expressway
  Bantan Renraku Road

International relations

Sister cities
 Newberg, Oregon, United States 
 Perth, Ontario, Canada

Friendship cities
 Barbizon, France

Local attractions
Ikuno Ginzan Silver Mine
Kuchiganaya area
Tanyo Museum
Ikuno Shoin
Asago Art Village
Takeda Castle
Tataragi Dam
Kurokawa Dam
Ikuno Dam

Noted people from Asago
Takashi Shimura, actor
Sanzo Wada, artist, costume designer

References

External links

 
 Official Asago Travel Guide 

Cities in Hyōgo Prefecture
Asago, Hyōgo